Frontier High School is a public high school in New Matamoras, Ohio, United States. It is the only high school in the Frontier Local School district. It is located along the Ohio River just off of Route 7 between New Matamoras and Newport Ohio. Their colors are Columbia blue and vegas gold, and are known as the Cougars. They are members of the Pioneer Valley Conference and the Ohio Valley Athletic Conference. Frontier was formed in 1968 with the consolidation of Bloomfield, Matamoras, Newport and Lawrence High Schools.

References

External links
District Website
Matamoras Area High Schools Alumni Database

Educational institutions in the United States with year of establishment missing
High schools in Washington County, Ohio
Public high schools in Ohio
Public middle schools in Ohio